The Modern Hotel is a site on the National Register of Historic Places in Whitehall, Montana.  It was added to the National Register on December 22, 2011.

It was later named Borden's Hotel and in 2013 received tax credit and loan funding to be renovated, with the renovation to create nine apartments above commercial units.<

References

Hotel buildings on the National Register of Historic Places in Montana
National Register of Historic Places in Jefferson County, Montana
1913 establishments in Montana
Hotel buildings completed in 1913